There have been 13 British monarchs since the political union of the Kingdom of England and the Kingdom of Scotland on 1 May 1707. England and Scotland had been in personal union since 24 March 1603. On 1 January 1801, the Kingdom of Great Britain and the Kingdom of Ireland merged, which resulted in the creation of the United Kingdom of Great Britain and Ireland, which became the United Kingdom of Great Britain and Northern Ireland on the secession of southern Ireland in the 1920s.

List
Queen Anne became monarch of the Kingdom of Great Britain after the political union of the Kingdom of England and the Kingdom of Scotland on 1 May 1707. She had ruled England, Scotland, and the Kingdom of Ireland since 8 March 1702. She continued as queen of Great Britain and Ireland until her death. Her total reign lasted 12 years and 147 days.

During the reign of Queen Anne, Parliament settled the rules of succession in the Act of Settlement 1701, defining Sophia of Hanover (granddaughter of James VI and I) and her non-Catholic descendants as the future royal heirs. The Crown passed from Queen Anne to Sophia's son King George I as Sophia had already died. Queen Anne and King George I were second cousins as both were great-grandchildren of James VI and I. For a family tree that shows George I's relationship to Anne, see .

|-
! colspan=8 style="background-color:#ccccff" | House of Stuart
|-
| Anne–()
| 
| 
| St James's PalaceDaughter of James VII and IIand Anne Hyde
| George of DenmarkSt James's Palace5 children 28 October 1708
| Kensington PalaceAged 49
| Daughter of James VII and IIBill of Rights 1689

|-
! colspan=8 style="background-color: #ccccff" | House of Hanover
|-
| George IGeorge Louis–11 June 1727()
| 
| 
| LeineschlossSon of Ernest Augustus of Brunswick-Lüneburgand  Sophia of the Palatinate
| Sophia Dorothea of Brunswick-Lüneburg-Celle2 children 28 December 1694 
| OsnabrückAged 67
| Great-grandson of James VI and IAct of Settlement 1701

|-
| George IIGeorge Augustus–25 October 1760()
| 
| 
| Herrenhausen PalaceSon of George Iand Sophia Dorothea of Brunswick-Lüneburg-Celle
| Caroline of Brandenburg-AnsbachHerrenhausen Gardens8 children 20 November 1737
| 25 October 1760Kensington PalaceAged 76
| Son of George I

|-
| George IIIGeorge William Frederick25 October 1760–29 January 1820()
| 
| 
| Norfolk HouseSon of Prince Frederickand Augusta of Saxe-Gotha
| Charlotte of Mecklenburg-StrelitzSt James's Palace8 September 176115 children 17 November 1818
| 29 January 1820Windsor CastleAged 81
| Grandson of George II

|-
| George IVGeorge Augustus Frederick29 January 1820—26 June 1830()
| 
| 
| 12 August 1762St James's PalaceSon of George IIIand Charlotte of Mecklenburg-Strelitz
| Caroline of Brunswick-WolfenbüttelSt James's Palace8 April 17951 daughter 7 August 1821
| 26 June 1830Windsor CastleAged 67
| rowspan=2 | Sons of George III

|-
| William IVWilliam Henry26 June 1830—20 June 1837()
| 
| 
| 21 August 1765Buckingham PalaceSon of George IIIand Charlotte of Mecklenburg-Strelitz
| Adelaide of Saxe-MeiningenKew Palace13 July 18182 daughters
| 20 June 1837Windsor CastleAged 71

|-
| VictoriaAlexandrina Victoria20 June 1837—22 January 1901()
| 
| 
| 24 May 1819Kensington PalaceDaughter of Prince Edward, Duke of Kent and Strathearnand Victoria of Saxe-Coburg-Saalfeld
| Albert of Saxe-Coburg and GothaSt James's Palace10 February 18409 children 14 December 1861
| 22 January 1901Osborne HouseAged 81
| Granddaughter of George III

|-
! colspan=8 style="background-color: #ccccff" | House of Saxe-Coburg and Gotha
|-
| Edward VIIAlbert Edward22 January 1901—6 May 1910()
| 
| 
| 9 November 1841Buckingham PalaceSon of Victoriaand Albert of Saxe-Coburg-Gotha
| Alexandra of DenmarkSt George's Chapel10 March 18636 children
| 6 May 1910Buckingham PalaceAged 68
| Son of Victoria
|-
! colspan=8 style="background-color: #ccccff" | House of Windsor

|-
| George VGeorge Frederick Ernest Albert6 May 1910—20 January 1936()
| 
| 
| 3 June 1865Marlborough HouseSon of Edward VIIand Alexandra of Denmark
| Mary of TeckSt James's Palace6 July 18936 children
|20 January 1936Sandringham HouseAged 70
| Son of Edward VII

|-
| Edward VIIIEdward Albert Christian George Andrew Patrick David20 January 1936—Abdicated 11 December 1936()
| 
| 
| 23 June 1894White LodgeSon of George Vand Mary of Teck
| Wallis SimpsonChâteau de Candé3 June 1937
| 28 May 1972Neuilly-sur-SeineAged 77
| rowspan=2|Sons of George V

|-
| George VIAlbert Frederick Arthur George11 December 1936—6 February 1952()
| 
| 
| 14 December 1895Sandringham HouseSon of George Vand Mary of Teck
| Elizabeth Bowes-LyonWestminster Abbey26 April 19232 daughters
| 6 February 1952Sandringham HouseAged 56

|-
| Elizabeth IIElizabeth Alexandra Mary6 February 1952—8 September 2022()
| 
| 
| 21 April 1926MayfairDaughter of George VIand Elizabeth Bowes-Lyon
| Philip MountbattenWestminster Abbey20 November 19474 children 9 April 2021
| 8 September 2022Balmoral CastleAged 96
| Daughter of George VI

|-
| Charles IIICharles Philip Arthur Georgesince 8 September 2022()
| 
|
| 14 November 1948Buckingham PalaceSon of Elizabeth IIand Philip Mountbatten
|  Diana SpencerSt Paul's Cathedral29 July 19812 sons 28 August 1996  Camilla Parker BowlesWindsor Guildhall9 April 2005
| LivingAge 
| Son of Elizabeth II

|}

Timeline

See also

List of monarchs in Britain by length of reign
Lists of monarchs in the British Isles
List of British royal consorts
Family tree of the British royal family
Succession to the British throne

Notes

References

External links

 
British